Smoke and Mirrors is the fifth studio album by the American hard rock band Lynch Mob released in 2009. The release sees the return of the original vocalist Oni Logan since their first album, Wicked Sensation, as well as the heavy metal/hard rock signature sound that the band is known for. Bassist Marco Mendoza (Thin Lizzy) and drummer Scot Coogan (Brides Of Destruction) complete the line-up.

Track listing

Personnel
Lynch Mob
Oni Logan – lead and backing vocals
George Lynch – guitars
Marco Mendoza – bass guitar, backing vocals
Scot Coogan – drums, backing vocals

Production
Bob Kulick – co–producer
Brett Chassen – co–producer, engineer, backing vocals
Yury Anisonyan, Rob Tarango – additional engineering
Matt Chidgey – mixing
Keith Blake – mastering

References

Lynch Mob (band) albums
2009 albums
Frontiers Records albums
Albums recorded at Sound City Studios